Sixmilebridge railway station is a railway station that serves the village of Sixmilebridge in County Clare, Ireland. It is located on the Shannon Road less than 1 km from the village.

All Limerick-Ennis and Limerick-Galway trains stop here.

History
The station opened on 17 January 1859, and closed on 17 June 1963.
The station reopened on 29 March 2010 as part of the rebuild of the Western Rail Corridor.

Facilities
The station is unmanned, with basic facilities provided, including a shelter and ticket machine

External links
Irish Rail Sixmilebridge Station Website

Iarnród Éireann stations in County Clare
Railway stations in County Clare
Railway stations opened in 1859
Railway stations closed in 1963
Railway stations opened in 2010